VW is Volkswagen, a German automobile manufacturer.

VW, V.W., Vw, or Vw. may also refer to:

Music
Vampire Weekend, an American rock band
"VW", a song on Fantasy Black Channel by Late of the Pier

Science and technology
VW Cephei, a binary star system
Van Wijngaarden grammar, in computer science
Viewport width, in Web design, a Cascading Style Sheets unit of length
Vowpal Wabbit, online machine-learning software

Other uses
Aeromar, a Mexican airline (IATA code: VW)
VW Hamme, a Belgian association football club
VW Herald, a cycling race held in South Africa